Mark Dresser (born September 26, 1952) is an American double bass player and composer.

Career
Dresser was born in Los Angeles, California, United States. In the 1970s, he was a member of Black Music Infinity led by Stanley Crouch and performed with the San Diego Symphony. During the next decade he moved to New York City and became a member of the Anthony Braxton quartet with Marilyn Crispell and Gerry Hemingway. He composed for the Arcado String Trio and Tambastics and for the film, The Cabinet of Dr. Caligari.

Discography

As leader
 Arcado with Arcado String Trio (JMT, 1989)
 Behind the Myth with Arcado String Trio (JMT, 1990)
 For Three Strings and Orchestra with Arcado String Trio (JMT, 1992)
 The Cabinet of Dr. Caligari (Knitting Factory, 1994)
 Invocation (Knitting Factory, 1995)
 Force Green (Soul Note, 1995)
 Live in Europe with Arcado String Trio (Avant, 1996)
 Banquet (Tzadik, 1997)
 Eye'll Be Seeing You (Knitting Factory, 1998)
 C/D/E with Andrew Cyrille (Pao, 2000)
 Marinade (Tzadik, 2000)
 Later with Fred Frith (Victo, 2000)
 The Marks Brothers with Mark Helias (W.E.R.F., 2000)
 Sonomondo with Frances-Marie Uitti (Cryptogramophone, 2000)
 Duologues with Denman Maroney (Victo, 2001)
 Reunion Live... at the Guelph Festival with Gerry Hemingway (Intrepid Ear, 2001)
 Aquifer (Cryptogramophone, 2002)
 Nine Songs Together with Ray Anderson (CIMP, 2003)
 Tone Time with Susie Ibarra (Wobbly Rail, 2003)
 Time Changes with Denman Maroney (Cryptogramophone, 2005)
 Unveil (Clean Feed, 2005)
 Airwalkers with Roswell Rudd (Clean Feed, 2006)
 House of Mirrors with Ed Harkins (Clean Feed, 2008)
 Duetto with Diane Moser (CIMP, 2008)
 Starmelodics with Kauffman/Eisenstadt (Nuscope, 2009)
 Live in Concert with Denman Maroney (Kadima Collective, 2009)
 Live at Lotus with Vinny Golia (Kadima Collective, 2010)
 Soul to Soul with Remi Alvarez (Intolerancia, 2010)
 Guts (Kadima Collective, 2010)
 Synastry with Jen Shyu (Pi, 2011)
 Nourishments (Clean Feed, 2013)
 Code Re(a)d with Gerry Hemingway (Hopscotch, 2014)
 Sedimental You (Clean Feed, 2016)
 Modicana (NoBusiness, 2017)
 Ain't Nothing But a Cyber Coup & You (Clean Feed, 2019)

As sideman
With Ray Anderson
 Harrisburg Half Life (Moers Music, 1980)
 It Just So Happens (Enja, 1987)
 Blues Bred in the Bone (Enja, 1988)
 What Because (Gramavision, 1990)

With Tim Berne
 Sanctified Dreams (Columbia 1987)
 Tim Berne's Fractured Fairy Tales (JMT, 1989)
 Pace Yourself (JMT, 1991)
 Diminutive Mysteries (Mostly Hemphill) (JMT, 1993)
 Nice View (JMT, 1994)

With Jane Ira Bloom
 The Red Quartets (Arabesque, 1999)
 Sometimes the Magic (Arabesque, 2001)
 Chasing Paint (Arabesque, 2003)
 Like Silver, Like Song (ArtistShare, 2005)

With Bobby Bradford
 Lost in L.A. (Soul Note, 1984)
 Live in L.A. (Clean Feed, 2011)
 Live at the Open Gate (NoBusiness, 2016)

With Anthony Braxton
 The Coventry Concert (West Wind, 1987)
 Five Compositions (Quartet) 1986 (Black Saint, 1986)
 If My Memory Serves Me Right (West Wind, 1987)
 Quartet (London) 1985 (Leo, 1988)
 Quartet (Birmingham) 1985 (Leo, 1991)
 Willisau (Quartet) 1991 (hat ART, 1992)
 Quartet (Coventry) 1985 (Leo, 1993)
 (Victoriaville) 1992 (Victo, 1993)
 Twelve Compositions (Music & Arts, 1994)
 Quartet (Santa Cruz) 1993 (hat ART, 1997)
 Quartet (New York) 1993 Set 1 (Braxton Bootleg, 2011)
 Quartet (New York) 1993 Set 2 (Braxton Bootleg, 2011)
 Quartet (London) 1991 04.02 Set 1 (Braxton Bootleg, 2013)
 Quartet (London) 1991 04.02 Set 2 (Braxton Bootleg, 2013)
 Quartet (London) 1991 04.03 Set 1 (Braxton Bootleg, 2013)
 Quartet (London) 1991 04.03 Set 2 (Braxton Bootleg, 2013)
 Quartet (Santa Cruz) 1993 1st Set (hatOLOGY, 2015)
 Quartet (Santa Cruz) 1993 2nd Set (hatOLOGY, 2015)
 Quartet (Willisau) 1991 Studio (hatOLOGY, 2018)

With Dave Douglas
 Parallel Worlds (Soul Note, 1993)
 Five (Soul Note, 1996)
 Sanctuary (Avant, 1997)

With Satoko Fujii
 Looking Out of the Window (Ninety-One, 1997)
 Kitsune-bi (Tzadik, 1999)
 Toward To West (Enja, 2000)
 Junction (EWE, 2001)
 Bell the Cat! (Tokuma, 2002)
 Illusion Suite (Libra, 2004)
 Live in Japan 2004 (Natsat Music, 2005)
 When We Were There (PJL, 2006)
 Trace a River (Libra, 2008)

With Gerry Hemingway
 Demon Chaser (hat ART, 1993)
 Down to the Wire (hat ART, 1993)
 The Marmalade King (hat ART, 1995)
 Slamadam (Random Acoustics, 1995)
 Perfect World (Random Acoustics, 1996)
 Johnny's Corner Song (Auricle, 1998)
 Chamber Works (Tzadik, 1999)
 Waltzes, Two-Steps & Other Matters of the Heart (GM, 1999)
 Devils Paradise (Clean Feed, 2003)

With Bob Ostertag
 Say No More (RecRec Music, 1993)
 Say No More in Person (Transit, 1993)
 Verbatim (Rastascan, 1996)
 Verbatim, Flesh and Blood (Rastascan, 1998)

With John Zorn
 Spy vs Spy: The Music of Ornette Coleman (Nonesuch, 1988)
 Kristallnacht (99 Records, 1993)
 Bar Kokhba (Tzadik, 1996)
 Cobra: John Zorn's Game Pieces Volume 2 (Tzadik, 2002)

With others
 Laurie Anderson, Strange Angels (Warner Bros. 1989)
 Gregg Bendian, Counterparts (CIMP, 1996)
 Gregg Bendian, Gregg Bendian's Interzone (Eremite, 1996)
 Salvatore Bonafede, For the Time Being (CAM Jazz, 2005)
 Eugene Chadbourne, Pain Pen (Avant, 2000)
 Alex Cline, For People in Sorrow (Cryptogramophone, 2013)
 Nels Cline, The Inkling (Cryptogramophone, 2000)
 Tom Cora, It's a Brand New Day (Knitting Factory, 2000)
 Marilyn Crispell, The Kitchen Concert (Leo, 1991)
 Marilyn Crispell, Mark Dresser, Gerry Hemingway, Play Braxton (Tzadik, 2012)
 Stanton Davis, Manhattan Melody (Enja, 1988)
 Robert Dick, Jazz Standards On Mars (Enja, 1997)
 Paul Dresher & Ned Rothenberg, Opposites Attract (New World/CounterCurrents 1991)
 Marty Ehrlich, The Long View (Enja, 2002)
 Amir ElSaffar, Radif Suite (Pi, 2010)
 Ellery Eskelin, Vanishing Point (hatOLOGY, 2001)
 David Garland, Togetherness: Control Songs Vol. 2 (Ergodic, 1999)
 Osvaldo Golijov  Yiddishbbuk (EMI, 2002)
 Osvaldo Golijov, Upshaw the Andalucian Dogs Ayre & Folk Songs (Deutsche Grammophon, 2005)
 Sebastian Gramss, Thinking Of (Wergo, 2014)
 Burton Greene, Peace Beyond Conflict (CIMP, 2002)
 Francois Houle, In the Vernacular (Songlines, 1998)
 Jason Hwang, Unfolding Stone (Sound Aspects, 1990)
 Steve Lehman, Interface (Clean Feed, 2004)
 Steuart Liebig, Pomegranate (Cryptogramophone, 2001)
 Frank London, The Debt (Tzadik, 1997)
 Russ Lossing, Metal Rat (Clean Feed, 2006)
 Joe Lovano, Flights of Fancy: Trio Fascination Edition Two (Blue Note, 2001)
 Denman Maroney, Fluxations (New World/CounterCurrents 2003)
 Raz Mesinai, Cyborg Acoustics (Tzadik, 2004)
 Sato Michihiro, Rodan (hat ART, 1989)
 Tisziji Munoz, Auspicious Healing! (Anami Music, 2000)
 Simon Nabatov, Projections (Clean Feed, 2015)
 Simon Nabatov, Equal Poise (Leo, 2016)
 James Newton, Binu (Circle, 1978)
 Kevin Norton, Integrated Variables (CIMP, 1996)
 Kevin Norton, Change Dance Troubled Energy (Barking Hoop, 2001)
 Ivo Perelman, Suite for Helen F. (Boxholder, 2003)
 Hot Pstromi, With a Little Horseradish On the Side (Global Village Music, 1993)
 Hank Roberts, Black Pastels (JMT, 1988)
 Herb Robertson, Elaboration (Clean Feed, 2005)
 Herb Robertson, Real Aberration (Clean Feed, 2007)
 Mick Rossi, One Block from Planet Earth (OmniTone, 2004)
 Ned Rothenberg, Power Lines (New World, 1995)
 Bernadette Speach, Reflections (Mode, 2002)
 Yale Strom, Klezmer: Cafe Jew Zoo (Naxos, 2002)
 Richard Teitelbaum, Blends (New Albion, 2002)
 Tiziano Tononi, Strange Mathematics (Splasc(H), 2008)
 Eric Watson, Silent Hearts (Free Flight, 1999)
 Eric Watson, Full Metal Quartet (OWL, 2000)
 Matthias Ziegler, Marsyas' Song (Percords, 1992)

References

External links
 Official site

1952 births
Living people
Musicians from Los Angeles
Jazz musicians from California
21st-century American male musicians
21st-century double-bassists
American jazz double-bassists
Arcado String Trio members
Avant-garde jazz musicians
Free improvising musicians
Free jazz double-bassists
Male double-bassists
American male jazz musicians
CIMP artists
Clean Feed Records artists
Enja Records artists
Knitting Factory Records artists
Pi Recordings artists
Tzadik Records artists
University of California, San Diego alumni
University of California, San Diego faculty
NoBusiness Records artists